Jonas Devouassoux (born 23 October 1989) is a French freestyle skier. He was born in Chamonix. He competed in ski cross at the World Ski Championships 2011, and at the 2014 Winter Olympics in Sochi, in ski-cross.

References

External links

1989 births
Living people
Freestyle skiers at the 2014 Winter Olympics
French male freestyle skiers
Olympic freestyle skiers of France
People from Chamonix
Sportspeople from Haute-Savoie